Amblyseius neofijiensis is a species of mite in the family Phytoseiidae.

References

neofijiensis
Articles created by Qbugbot
Animals described in 1995